Mariya Dimova (born 12 August 1929) was a Bulgarian cross-country skier. She competed in the women's 10 kilometres at the 1956 Winter Olympics.

References

External links
 

1929 births
Possibly living people
Bulgarian female cross-country skiers
Olympic cross-country skiers of Bulgaria
Cross-country skiers at the 1956 Winter Olympics
Place of birth missing (living people)